The Italian records in swimming are the fastest times ever swum by a swimmer representing Italy in competition. These records are ratified by the Italian Swimming Federation (FIN, Federazione Italiana Nuoto).

Records marked with a hash (#) are currently awaiting ratification by FIN or have been obtained since the last version of the official lists.

All records were achieved in finals unless otherwise specified.

Long course (50 m)

Men

Women

Mixed relay

Short course (25 m)

Men

Women

Mixed relay

See also
Italy national swimming team

References
General
Italian Long Records – Men 16 August 2022 updated
Italian Long Records – Women 15 August 2022 updated
Italian Short Records – Men 18 December 2022 updated
Italian Short Records – Women 23 December 2022 updated
Specific

External links 
FIN (Federazione Italiana Nuoto). (Italian)

Italy
Records
Swimming
Swimming